The Serenade is a 1916 American silent comedy film featuring Oliver Hardy. This film survives at the Library of Congress cataloged as Jim The Serenade.

Plot summary

Cast
 Oliver Hardy - Plump (as Babe Hardy)
 Billy Ruge - Runt
 Billy Bletcher - Schmitte
 Florence McLaughlin - Florence (as Florence McLoughlin)

See also
 List of American films of 1916
 Oliver Hardy filmography

References

External links
 
 

1916 films
American silent short films
American black-and-white films
1916 comedy films
1916 short films
Silent American comedy films
American comedy short films
1910s American films